The British Embassy in Pristina is the United Kingdom's diplomatic mission to Kosovo. It is located at 177 Lidhja e Pejës, Pristina, Kosovo. The embassy also represents the British Overseas Territories in Kosovo.

History
The United Kingdom formally recognised the independence of the Republic of Kosovo on 18 February 2008 and established an embassy in Pristina on 5 March 2008.

Ambassadors

2008: David Blunt
2008–2010: Andrew Sparkes
2011–2015: Ian Cliff
2015–2019: Ruairí O'Connell

2019-:  Nicholas Abbott

See also
 Embassy of Kosovo, London
 Kosovo–United Kingdom relations
 List of diplomatic missions of the United Kingdom
 List of diplomatic missions in Kosovo

References

External links 
 Embassy of the United Kingdom, Pristina official website
 Embassy of the United Kingdom, Pristina on Facebook
 Embassy of the United Kingdom, Pristina on Twitter

Buildings and structures in Pristina
Kosovo–United Kingdom relations
Pristina